Helicia glabriflora is a species of rainforest shrubs or small trees occurring in eastern Australia. Common names include smooth or pale helicia, pale, leather or brown oak. They grow naturally in a variety of different rainforest types from the Illawarra, New South Wales (34° S) to the Townsville area, Queensland (19° S). Of all the global diversity of approximately one hundred Helicia species, this one species naturally grows the furthest south, in the Minnamurra Rainforest and the Robertson area, Illawarra, New South Wales, there observed more on the relatively fertile basalt and alluvial soils.

The grey or brown trunk is fairly smooth, with some bumps and horizontal lines. The leaf stems measure between 1 and 3 mm long, swollen at the base; often reduced to a pulvinus.

The yellow or white flowers open from April to September, arranged in bottle–brush–shaped compound inflorescences. The flowers and fruit have the characteristic appearance of the plant family Proteaceae. The seeds are slow to germinate, usually complete after three months with a 90% success rate.

References

glabrifolia
Flora of New South Wales
Flora of Queensland
Trees of Australia
Taxa named by Ferdinand von Mueller